The 2014 season was the 100th in Sociedade Esportiva Palmeiras existence. This season marked the Palmeiras return to the top flight of Brazilian football after being promoted from 2013 Campeonato Brasileiro Série B. Palmeiras also competed in the state league, Campeonato Paulista, and Copa do Brasil.

Key events 

 November 26, 2013: After some speculation, coach Gilson Kleina's contract was renewed for one more year.
 December 14, 2013: First sign for the 2014 season, the forward Rodolfo, age 20, scored 24 goals in 27 matches for the Rio Claro in the 2013 U-20 Campeonato Paulista.
 December 30, 2013: The second sign for the 2014 season, is the midfielder França coming from loan from the German team Hannover 96.
 January 9, 2014: The 2002 FIFA World Cup winner with Brazil the defender Lúcio signed with Palmeiras for 2 years. At the same day Palmeiras announced other defender, the Uruguyan Mauricio Victorino who defended Uruguay in the 2010 FIFA World Cup.
 January 24, 2014: The midfielder Bruno César signs a loan from Saudi side Al-Ahli until December 2014.
 February 21, 2014: Valdivia is called up by Jorge Sampaoli the Chile national football team coach for the friendly against Germany on March 5. Chile lost match, 1–0 on a goal scored by Mario Götze. Valdivia played the last 15 minutes of the match.
 March 6, 2014: After beating Portuguesa by 1–0, Palmeiras is the first team to reach the Campeonato Paulista Quarterfinals.
 March 23, 2014: Palmeiras finishes Campeonato Paulista first phase with a 2–1 loss for Santos. With this, Palmeiras has the second best campaign overall.
 April 14, 2014: After the end of the Campeonato Paulista, three Palmeiras players were awarded: Alan Kardec best forward, Lúcio best defender and Fernando Prass best goalkeeper.
 April 28, 2014: In an interview the Palmeiras President Paulo Nobre said the team top goalscorer at that moment Alan Kardec is leaving Palmeiras for rivals São Paulo. The team and Kardec had problems with negotiation to renew his contract and the São Paulo offered more money for the player.
 May 8, 2014: The head coach Gilson Kleina was sacked after the loss to Sampaio Corrêa and the sequence of bad results.
 May 21, 2014: After some negotiations, Palmeiras announced the Argentinean Ricardo Gareca as a new coach. Gareca is the sixth Argentinean coach in the Palmeiras history.
 July 15, 2014: One of the latest Palmeiras idols Jorge Valdivia is leaving the team, the destination of the Chilean is the Fujairah SC from United Arab Emirates. But after some disagreements the transfers was canceled. Valdivia said the reason for the transfer be canceled because the team owners said "it was a lot of money, and this could be used to build hospitals and schools".
 September 1, 2014: After only three months, head coach Ricardo Gareca was sacked after a bad sequence of results. Gareca's record was four wins, one draw and eight losses. Alberto Valentim assumed the team, as an interim coach.
 September 3, 2014: Dorival Júnior signed as a new head coach.
 November 6, 2014: CBF confirmed that Palmeiras's first match in Allianz Parque would be against Sport on November 19. The stadium was under construction since 2010.
 December 8, 2014: Dorival Júnior was fired at the end of the season.

Players

Squad information 
.

 (on loan from Cruzeiro)

Competitions

Overview

Friendlies

Pre-season

Copa EuroAmericana 

The Copa EuroAmericana is a friendly tournament created by DirecTV that take place in South America and North America on 20 July – 2 August 2014. Thirteen teams from CONMEBOL, CONCACAF and UEFA participate in it. Palmeiras will play only one match in the tournament.

Campeonato Paulista

Standings

First stage 
In the first stage, the teams played in a group with all of the clubs of other groups in a single round, qualifying for the quarter-final the 2 teams with the most points won this stage in each of the groups.

Source: Soccerway.com

Quarterfinals 

Each tie, apart from the final was played over two legs, and the team with the best campaign playing the second leg at home. The quarterfinals was played between the winners and runners-up of each group. In the semifinals the best team (first) faced the team with the worst campaign (fourth), while the second faced the team with the third best campaign.

Semifinal 

Source: Soccerway.com

Copa do Brasil 

The competition is a single elimination knockout tournament featuring two-legged ties. In the first two rounds, if the away team wins the first match by 2 or more goals, it progresses straight to the next round avoiding the second leg. The away goals rule is also used in the Copa do Brasil. The winner qualifies for the 2015 Copa Libertadores.

Draw held on January 10.

First round

Second round

Third round

Round of 16 

For this round a draw will be held, which happened on August 18.

Source: Soccerway.com

Campeonato Brasileiro

Standings

Matches 
Schedule released on February 6. The first nine rounds (dates, times and stadiums) were detailed on March 18. The matches had a break during the 2014 FIFA World Cup which was held between June and July in Brazil. The competition was played nine rounds before the stoppage.

Notes

Source: Soccerway.com

Transfers

In

Out

Statistics

Overall statistics

Goalscorers 
In italic players who left the team in mid-season.

Disciplinary record 
In italic players who left the team in mid-season.

References

External links 
 Official site 

2014
Palmeiras